The Carson and Tahoe Lumber and Fluming Company (C&TL&F) was formed to move lumber from trees growing along the shore of Lake Tahoe to the silver mines of the Comstock Lode.

Origins
Augustus Pray moved to Glenbrook, Nevada on the shore of Lake Tahoe in 1860. In 1863 he had two steam engines delivered. He used the first to build a sawmill at Glenbrook; and the second was used to power the  paddle wheel tugboat Governor Blasdel built with some of the lumber he milled from nearby forests. The tugboat was then used to tow rafts of logs to his sawmill from more distant shores of Lake Tahoe. Lumber was in great demand on the opposite side of the ridge separating Lake Tahoe from the silver mines to the east. Aside from the need for homes to shelter the miners and associated commercial enterprises, the silver ore deposit required large quantities of lumber for a newly designed square set timbering structure to prevent collapse of weak rock overlying the ore body. The  Truckee and  propeller-driven Emerald began towing log rafts to Glenbrook in 1870. Duane Leroy Bliss formed C&TL&F in 1872 to build a narrow-gauge railway up the hill from the sawmill at Glenbrook to Spooner Summit, and to purchase the Marlette Lake Water System with a wooden flume to float the lumber  from the summit dropping  to the Virginia and Truckee Railroad at Carson City, Nevada.

Lake Tahoe Railroad

The V-shaped flume built by the Summit Fluming Company in 1869 was purchased first, and lumber moved uphill in wagons until the  Lake Tahoe Railroad was built in 1875 to carry production from two more sawmills C&TL&F built at Glenbrook in 1873 and 1875. The route climbed  following North Canyon Creek and required two switchbacks to reach the  summit at an average grade of 2.44 percent with some as steep as 4 percent. Baldwin Locomotive Works built two 2-6-0 locomotives named Tahoe and Glenbrook. Either locomotive could pull six flatcars of lumber to the summit, and trains sometimes used twelve cars with one locomotive pulling and the other pushing. By 1877 the railroad had 75 flatcars; and a third similar locomotive was built that year to move the desired volume of lumber when one of the locomotives required repairs. Railroad and flume operations were coordinated by installation of one of the first telephone systems in the west between Glenbrook and Carson City. As additional log raft towing capacity was required, C&TL&F purchased the  Meteor in 1876 the  Emerald (II) in 1887. C&TL&F's second Glendale sawmill burned in 1887; so their remaining Rigby sawmill shifted to 24-hour operation to sustain lumber production.

Lake Valley Railroad

In 1886 C&TL&F purchased George Chubbuck's Lake Valley Railroad south from Bijou, California up to Meyers, California. The railroad brought logs down to Lake Tahoe, where C&TL&F steamboats would tow them to the Glendale sawmills. The Lake Valley Railroad initially used  square timbers as wooden rails for a primitive locomotive fabricated by Vulcan Iron Works of San Francisco. The locomotive was used as a stationary steam donkey after it destroyed the wooden rails; so Chubbuck laid conventional 35-pound rails and purchased the narrow-gauge 0-6-0 used for construction of the Nevada-California-Oregon Railway. C&TL&F sent one of their Lake Tahoe Railroad locomotives over to assist the Porter locomotive built in 1875 after they purchased the line. Both locomotives were sold to the Nevada County Narrow Gauge Railroad when the Lake Valley Railroad was dismantled in 1898.

Lake Tahoe Railway and Transportation Company
Demand for lumber declined as Comstock Lode ore depletion became evident. Bliss shifted his attention to building a steamboat landing at Tahoe City, California for his Tahoe Tavern resort. Bliss formed the Lake Tahoe Railway and Transportation Company in 1895 to launch the 200-passenger Tahoe in 1896 and acquire the rebuilt passenger steamer Nevada. When transfer of lumber over the C&TL&F flume ended in 1898, the Lake Tahoe Railroad was dismantled and shipped across Lake Tahoe to be reassembled in 1899 as a  tourist railroad connecting Tahoe City to the Southern Pacific Railroad at Truckee, California.

References

External links

Transportation in Douglas County, Nevada
Defunct Nevada railroads
Historic American Engineering Record in Nevada
History of Douglas County, Nevada
Railway companies established in 1872
Railway companies disestablished in 1898
1872 establishments in Nevada
3 ft gauge railways in the United States
Railways with Zig Zags
Defunct manufacturing companies based in Nevada